Ramazan Juma Zada is an ethnic Hazara politician from Afghanistan, who was the representative of the people of Kabul province in the 16th term of the Afghanistan Parliament.

Early life 
Ramazan Juma Zada was born on 1987 in Shibar District of Bamyan province. He completed his secondary education at "Pul-e-Khumri High School" in Baghlan province and entered the Faculty of Medicine of Balkh University.

See also 
 List of Hazara people

References 

Living people
1987 births
Hazara politicians
People from Bamyan Province